Timothy Drury  (born July 5, 1961) is an American composer, keyboardist, guitarist, vocalist, songwriter and visual artist. His big breakthrough came in 1989 when Don Henley invited him to join The End of the Innocence tour as his pianist, keyboardist and backup vocalist. A few years later, he was back on tour playing keyboard, guitar and singing backup vocals with the Eagles for their "Hell Freezes Over" reunion, a tour that lasted from 1994 to 2000. He toured for seven years with the rock band Whitesnake, and with a friendly departure in September 2010, he left the band to pursue a solo career. As a composer, lyricist and songwriter, Drury has several co-writes to his credit, including music with guitarist Don Felder, formerly with the Eagles, songs with Henley and Scott F. Crago, and with Stevie Nicks and Crago. His father is the late James Drury, best known for his starring role in the TV series, The Virginian.

Early life and career
Drury was born and raised in Los Angeles, California. He is the son of actor James Drury and Cristall Orton Drury, and has an older brother, James III. His interest in music began when he was a small boy, and by the age of 5 he was taking piano lessons on a spinet piano his maternal grandmother had purchased. By the age of 11, he was writing his first songs and melodies. Through the years, he honed his skills as a writer and secured a position as a staff writer at Warner Chappell Music.

His big break in the music industry came in 1989 when he was asked to join Don Henley's ensemble as keyboardist for The End of the Innocence tour. The Chicago Tribune described the tour as a chance for Henley "to ponder the enormity of it all: life, death, love, government, deceit and a growing social malaise" and that "little was lost to The End of the Innocence`s stage version, fueled by Tim Drury's piano." Following that tour, Drury worked with many other famous musicians and bands, such as the Eagles, Don Felder, Bryan Adams, Melissa Etheridge, Stevie Nicks and Whitesnake.

As a songwriter, Drury co-wrote "Everything is Different Now" with Henley and Scott F. Crago. It was included on the album Inside Job which was released in May 2000, and debuted at No. 7 on the Billboard 200. At the time, it was Henley's highest charting album. He later co-wrote together with Stevie Nicks and Crago, the single "That Made Me Stronger", sung by Nicks. The song is included on Nicks' 2001 album Trouble in Shangri-La.

Drury released a self-titled album in 1996.

Drury was a member of super-group The Mob featuring Doug Pinnick of King's X, Reb Beach of Winger and Whitesnake, Kip Winger, and Kelly Keagy of Night Ranger. The Mob released a self-titled album in 2005.

Drury toured as a member of Whitesnake on their extensive world tour to promote their record, Good To Be Bad.  He performed on their 2011 album Forevermore. He toured as a keyboardist for Don Felder and performed on Felder's 2012 record, Road to Forever, and co-wrote nine of the songs on that album.

References

External links
 Official site

1961 births
20th-century American musicians
21st-century American keyboardists
21st-century American musicians
21st-century American male musicians
Living people
20th-century American keyboardists
20th-century American male musicians
The Mob (American band) members